Neptis woodwardi, or Woodward's sailer, is a butterfly in the family Nymphalidae. It is found in Uganda and Kenya.

Subspecies
Neptis woodwardi woodwardi (Kenya: west of the Rift Valley, eastern Uganda)
Neptis woodwardi translima Collins & Larsen, 1991 (Kenya: central highlands)

References

Butterflies described in 1899
woodwardi
Butterflies of Africa
Taxa named by Emily Mary Bowdler Sharpe